The School of Medicine, Mae Fah Luang University is a medical school in Mueang Chiang Rai District, Chiang Rai Province.

History 
The School of Medicine, Mae Fah Luang was established on 18 January 2012 following approval of the council of Mae Fah Luang University. The MD course was approved by the Medical Council of Thailand on 7 February 2013 and admitted 32 medical students in the 2013 academic year. Students study at the main Mae Fah Luang University campus during the preclinical years (Year 1-3) before separating to affiliated teaching hospitals in the clinical years (Year 4-6). The Mae Fah Luang University Medical Center Hospital which will become the main teaching hospital is scheduled to open in December 2019.

Teaching Hospitals

University Hospital 
 Mae Fah Luang University Medical Center Hospital

Main Hospitals 
 BMA General Hospital, Bangkok
 Charoenkrung Pracharak Hospital, Bangkok
 Lamphun Hospital, Lamphun

Affiliated Hospitals 

 Sukhothai Hospital, Sukhothai
 Srisangworn Sukhothai Hospital, Sukhothai
 Nan Hospital, Nan
 Fang Hospital, Chiang Mai

See also 
 List of medical schools in Thailand

References 

Article incorporates material from the corresponding article in the Thai Wikipedia.

Medical schools in Thailand
University departments in Thailand